H. G. Wells: War with the World is a 2006 BBC Television docudrama telling the life story of the British author H. G. Wells, who is played in the film by Michael Sheen. The title of the film echoes that of one of Wells' best-known novels, The War of the Worlds (1898).

Plot
The film dramatises the story of the author's life, by using H. G. Wells' own words. It tells the story of Wells' transformation from self-confident womaniser, socialist radical and young literary prophet to burdened missionary, dedicated to creating a World State.

Cast

Michael Sheen as H. G. Wells
Sally Hawkins as Rebecca West
Sarah Winman as Jane Wells
Dermot Crowley as George Bernard Shaw
Branka Katic as Moura Budberg
Jacek Koman as Maxim Gorky
Kenneth Jay as Henry James
Michael Cochrane as Minister
Rebecca Ramsden as Millie
Elizabeth Elvin as Mrs. Hallam
Keir Charles as Sykes
Shane Board as Frank Wells
Abigail Davies as Russian Reporter
Roger Heathcott as Josef Stalin
Thomas-James Fisher as Jip Wells
Lady Sara Rönneke as Georgie
Chris Wilson as Reporter

References

External links 
 
 

BBC television docudramas
2006 British television series debuts
Cultural depictions of H. G. Wells
Cultural depictions of George Bernard Shaw
Cultural depictions of Joseph Stalin